Michael Roy Blowers (born April 24, 1965) is a German-born American former Major League Baseball player, a third baseman and first baseman for the New York Yankees, Seattle Mariners, Los Angeles Dodgers, and Oakland Athletics. Since 2007 he has been a color commentator for Mariners television and radio broadcasts.

Early years 
Born in Würzburg, West Germany, Blowers lived in Oklahoma and then West Germany until the seventh grade, when his U.S. Army stepfather was transferred to Fort Lewis, south of Tacoma, Washington. He is a 1983 graduate of Bethel High School in Spanaway and played college baseball at Tacoma Community College and the University of Washington in Seattle. Following his freshman year, Blowers was selected by the Mariners in the 1984 Major League Baseball Draft, but opted not to sign. During his junior year at Washington, his only season with the Huskies, he won the triple crown in the Pac-10 North Division, and was selected by the Montreal Expos in the tenth round of the 1986 MLB Draft.

Professional career 
Blowers made his Major League Baseball debut with the New York Yankees on September 1, and played his last game on October 3,  with the Seattle Mariners.

During a Yankees road game against the Texas Rangers at Arlington Stadium on April 21, 1990, Blowers hit his first two MLB home runs, the first off Charlie Hough in the fifth inning, and the second off Craig McMurtry in the ninth. On May 3, playing in Yankee Stadium, he committed 4 errors at third base, leading to 7 unearned runs, in a 10-5 loss to the Cleveland Indians. At the time he was the 21st American League third basemen to have such a terrible day.  On the other hand, the only third baseman to commit more errors in a game was Dave Brain, with 5, for the Boston Beaneaters in 1906.

He hit for the cycle on May 18, as a member of the Oakland Athletics.

In 1995, Blowers hit .257 with 23 home runs and 96 RBI for the Mariners as they made their first postseason and advanced to the American League Championship Series. His 33 RBI in August remains the most by a Mariners player in a single month, a record he co-holds with Mariners Hall of Fame third baseman and designated hitter Edgar Martínez.

In 1999, Blowers played 73 games with the Hanshin Tigers of the Nippon Professional Baseball league.

Post-playing career
Since 2007, Blowers has been a television and radio color commentator for the Seattle Mariners. He worked alongside Ford C. Frick Baseball Hall of Fame Award broadcaster Dave Niehaus, and continues to work with Dave Sims.

Blowers was inducted into the Tacoma Community College Athletics Hall of Fame in 2007.

Blowers owns and manages a number of Washington-based companies, including Beach Wood Homes of Fife and Keymark Real Estate of Puyallup.

Prediction of Tuiasosopo's first career home run
During the pre-game broadcast of a September 27, 2009, bout between the Mariners and the Toronto Blue Jays, Blowers predicted Matt Tuiasosopo's first career home run. What started as simply selecting a notable player for the day's game became an extended humorous rant by Blowers. In the course of pre-game banter, he stated that the home run would come in Tuiasosopo's second at bat, on a fastball from Brian Tallet with a 3-1 count, and that the ball would land in the second deck of left center field. This then happened - with correct prediction of player, at-bat, count, pitch, and general landing area - in the top of the fifth inning.

Blowers was on the television side of the broadcast when the prediction came true, and laughed it off without explanation, though days later explained that Tallet likes to throw fastballs, but has poor control of his pitches. Tallet was also a relief pitcher who was in the starting rotation in the 2009 season, increasing his workload. Radio announcers Rick Rizzs and Dave Niehaus, however, recalled the prediction, restated it for the audience, and were beside themselves in laughter and disbelief as the prediction came true. Said Niehaus on-air, seconds before the event, "I've never been so excited on a 3-1 count in my life!" As Tuiasosopo circled the bases, Niehaus exclaimed "I see the light! I believe you Mike!"

See also
 List of Major League Baseball players to hit for the cycle

References

External links

Seattle Mariners – Broadcasters
Page on "Seattle Mariners" All-time Roster
ESPN's Mike Blowers career notes
Mike Blowers Fries Fansite
Reporter Shannon Drayer's blog, detailing the predicted home run

1965 births
Living people
Calgary Cannons players
Columbus Clippers players
Gulf Coast Expos players
Hanshin Tigers players
Indianapolis Indians players
Jacksonville Expos players
Jamestown Expos players
Los Angeles Dodgers players
Major League Baseball broadcasters
Major League Baseball first basemen
Major League Baseball third basemen
Major League Baseball players from Germany
New York Yankees players
Oakland Athletics players
Baseball players from Tacoma, Washington
Seattle Mariners announcers
Seattle Mariners players
Tacoma Rainiers players
Tacoma Titans baseball players
University of Washington alumni
Washington Huskies baseball players
West Palm Beach Expos players
People from Spanaway, Washington
Sportspeople from Würzburg